The 2016 Abilene Christian Wildcats football team represented Abilene Christian University in the 2016 NCAA Division I FCS football season. They were led by fifth-year head coach Ken Collums. They played their home games at Shotwell Stadium. The 2016 season was to be the final season for the Wildcats at Shotwell Stadium. Beginning with the 2017 season, the Wildcats' home will be the on-campus Wildcat Stadium which is currently under construction. They finished the season 2–9, 2–7 in Southland play to finish in tenth place.

Previous season
The Wildcats finished the 2015 season 3–8, 3–6 in Southland play to finish in a three-way tie for eighth place.

Schedule
Source:

Game summaries

@ Air Force

Sources:

Northern Colorado

Sources:

@ Houston Baptist

Sources:

@ Stephen F. Austin

Central Arkansas

Sources:

Lamar

Sources:

@ Sam Houston State

Sources:

Incarnate Word

Sources: Box Score

@ McNeese State

Sources:

Northwestern State

Sources:

This will be Abilene Christian's final game at Shotwell Stadium.

@ Southeastern Louisiana

Sources:

References

Abilene Christian
Abilene Christian Wildcats football seasons
Abilene Christian Wildcats football